David Starr may refer to:

 David Starr (politician), New Hampshire State Senator
 David Starr (racing driver) (born 1967), American stock car driver
 David Starr (wrestler) (born 1991), American professional wrestler
 David Starr Jordan (1851–1931), American ichthyologist and first president of Indiana University
 David Starr, protagonist of Lucky Starr series by Isaac Asimov
 David Newbury (David Starr Newbury, born 1942), American professor of African studies
 David Ngoombujarra (David Bernard Starr, 1967–2011), Australian actor

See also 
 David Starr Jordan High School, Los Angeles
 David Starr, Space Ranger, 1952 juvenile science fiction novel by Isaac Asimov
 NOAAS David Starr Jordan (R 444), American fisheries research vessel